Major-General George Charles Kelly  (October 1880 – April 1938) was a British Army officer.

Military career
Educated at Wellington College, Berkshire and the Royal Military College, Sandhurst, Kelly was commissioned into the King's Royal Rifle Corps on 11 November 1899. He was severely wounded at the Battle of the Tugela Heights in South Africa in February 1900 during the Second Boer War.

During the First World War he served as commanding officer of the 2nd Battalion, King’s Royal Rifle Corps from September 1917 to March 1918 when he became commander of the 2nd Infantry Brigade. He led his brigade in the German spring offensive and Hundred Days Offensive, during which he was wounded again in September 1918.

He became commander of 15th Infantry Brigade in April 1932 and then became General Officer Commanding the 49th (West Riding) Infantry Division in September 1935 before his death in April 1938.

References

1880 births
1938 deaths
British Army major generals
Companions of the Order of the Bath
Companions of the Distinguished Service Order
King's Royal Rifle Corps officers
People educated at Wellington College, Berkshire
British Army generals of World War I
Graduates of the Royal Military College, Sandhurst
British Army personnel of the Second Boer War